Trần Thị Thảo (born November 24, 1991) is a Vietnamese professional volleyball player who plays for Thong tin Lien Viet Post Bank and the Vietnam women's national volleyball team.
Thảo was the key player to the success of the National Team at the VTV International Women's Volleyball Cup 2014 in Bắc Ninh.

Clubs 
  Thông tin Liên Việt Post Bank (? – 2017)

Awards

Clubs
 2010 Vietnam League -  Champion, with Thông tin Liên Việt Post Bank
 2011 Vietnam League -  Runner-Up, with Thông tin Liên Việt Post Bank
 2012 Vietnam League -  Champion, with Thông tin Liên Việt Post Bank
 2013 Vietnam League -  Champion, with Thông tin Liên Việt Post Bank
 2014 Vietnam League -  Champion, with Thông tin Liên Việt Post Bank
 2015 Vietnam League -  Champion, with Thông tin Liên Việt Post Bank
 2016 Vietnam League -  Runner-Up, with Thông tin Liên Việt Post Bank

References

1991 births
Living people
Vietnamese women's volleyball players
Sportspeople from Hanoi
Vietnam women's international volleyball players
Opposite hitters
21st-century Vietnamese women